Lanquetot is a commune in the Seine-Maritime department in the Normandy region in northern France.

Geography

Heraldry

Population

Places of interest
 The church of St. Aubin, dating from the eleventh century.

See also
Communes of the Seine-Maritime department

References

Communes of Seine-Maritime